XHMAC-FM is a radio station on 95.3 FM in Manzanillo, Colima, transmitting from Cerro del Toro. The station is owned by Radiorama and carries a grupera format known as La Poderosa.

History
XHMAC received its concession as XEMAC-AM 1330 on February 24, 1993. It was originally owned by Radio Teponaztli, S.A. and broadcast as a daytimer with 500 watts of power.

References

Radio stations in Colima